Johor Bahru City Council (MBJB) is the city council which administrates Johor Bahru city centre and other areas of the Iskandar Malaysia area in Johor, Malaysia. This agency is under Johor state government. MBJB are responsible for public health and sanitation, waste removal and management, town planning, environmental protection and building control, social and economic development and general maintenance functions of urban infrastructure.

History 
Formerly known as Majlis Perbandaran Johor Bahru (MPJB) (Johor Bahru Municipal Council). Johor Bahru was granted a city status on 1 January 1994.

President/Mayors of Johor Bahru (Datuk Bandar)

Organisation chart

Mayor of Johor Bahru (Datuk Bandar)
Dato’ Haji Mohd Noorazam bin Dato' Haji Osman

Secretary
Haji Miswan bin Yunus

Deputy Secretary
Hajah Nazatul Shima bt Mohamad

Administration areas

Branch office
 Larkin
 Taman Pelangi
 Stulang
 Permas Jaya
 Bandar Baru UDA
 Tampoi

See also
 Iskandar Puteri City Council
 Pasir Gudang City Council

References

External links 
 MBJB official web site 

1994 establishments in Malaysia
Johor Bahru
Johor Bahru
City councils in Malaysia